The Bog Bridge, also known as the Cilleyville Bridge, is a historic covered bridge in Andover, New Hampshire. Built in 1887 and located off New Hampshire Route 11 west of Andover center, the Town lattice truss bridge is one of New Hampshire's few surviving 19th-century covered bridges, and is relatively little altered since its construction, having had its roof replaced and an abutment reconstructed. The bridge was listed on the National Register of Historic Places in 1989.

Description and history
The Bog Bridge spans Pleasant Brook, a tributary of the Blackwater River, just south of where New Hampshire Route 11 crosses the river. The asphalt shingle roof, a replacement made in 1982, is the only major modification to the bridge. The bridge rests on abutments of roughly coursed granite blocks; the eastern abutment is original, without mortar, while the western abutment was damaged in the 1938 New England hurricane and rebuilt with cement mortar. The trusses were at some time reinforced with iron bolts. The bridge is unusual among New Hampshire's covered bridges in that it lacks lateral bracing, which caused the bridge to be slightly tilted for many years.

The Town through truss bridge was built in 1887 by local carpenter Prentice C. Atwood. The bridge originally carried Bog Road across Pleasant Brook, but was reduced to foot traffic when the current alignment of New Hampshire Route 11 bypassed it in 1957. Of at least seven documented 19th or early 20th-century covered bridges in the town, it is one of only two that survives (the other is the Keniston Bridge).

See also

National Register of Historic Places listings in Merrimack County, New Hampshire
List of bridges on the National Register of Historic Places in New Hampshire

References

Covered bridges on the National Register of Historic Places in New Hampshire
Bridges completed in 1887
Buildings and structures in Merrimack County, New Hampshire
National Register of Historic Places in Merrimack County, New Hampshire
Andover, New Hampshire
Road bridges on the National Register of Historic Places in New Hampshire
Wooden bridges in New Hampshire
Parker truss bridges in the United States